This is a list of famous people who were born or have lived in Moscow, Russia.

Born in Moscow

13th–17th century

1201–1700 
 Ivan I of Moscow (1288–1341), Prince of Moscow from 1325 and Grand Prince of Vladimir from 1328.
 Vasily I of Moscow (1371–1425) Grand Prince of Moscow, 1389–1425. 
 Vasily II of Moscow (1415–1462), Grand Prince of Moscow whose long reign (1425–1462) was plagued by the greatest civil war of Old Russian history.
 Ivan III of Russia (1440–1505), Grand Prince of Moscow and Grand Prince of all Rus (1462–1505).
 Basil Fool for Christ (1468–1552), Russian Orthodox saint
 Helena of Moscow (1476–1513), daughter of Ivan III the Great, Grand Prince of Moscow, and an uncrowned Grand Duchess of Lithuania and Queen of Poland as she would not convert from Eastern Orthodoxy to Catholicism
 Vasili III of Russia (1479–1533) the Grand Prince of Moscow, 1505 to 1533.
 Vasili IV of Russia (ca.1552–1612) Tsar of Russia, 1606 and 1610. 
 Patriarch Filaret of Moscow (1553–1633) a Russian boyar & Patriarch of Moscow.
 Feodor I of Russia (1557–1598), last Rurikid Tsar of Russia (1584–1598).
 Feodor II of Russia (1589–1605), Tsar of Russia (1605).
 Alexis of Russia (1629–1676), Tsar of Russia, 1645–1676.
 Boris Sheremetev (1652–1719), diplomat and general field marshal during the Great Northern War
 Sofia Alekseyevna of Russia (1657–1704), regent of Russia from 1682 to 1689.
 Feodor III of Russia (1661–1682), Tsar of all Russia (1676–1682).
 Ivan V of Russia (1666–1696), Tsar of all Russia (1682–1696).
 Eudoxia Lopukhina (1669–1731), the first wife of Peter I of Russia.
 Peter the Great (1672–1725), Tsar of All Russia (1682–1725), Emperor of All Russia (1721–1725).
 Mikhail Golitsyn (1675–1730), field marshal.
 Tsarevna Catherine Ivanovna of Russia (1691–1733), Duchess of Mecklenburg-Schwerin, daughter of Tsar Ivan V, eldest sister of Empress Anna of Russia
 Laurentius Blumentrost (1692–1755), personal physician to the Tsar, founder and first president of the Saint Petersburg Academy of Sciences
 Alexey Bestuzhev-Ryumin (1693–1766) a Russian diplomat and chancellor.
 Anna of Russia (1693–1740), Empress of Russia (1730–1740).

18th century

1701–1800 
 Grand Duchess Anna Petrovna of Russia (1708–1728), Duchess of Schleswig-Holstein-Gottorp
 Elizabeth of Russia (1709–1762), Empress of All the Russias (1741–1762).
 Alexander Sumarokov (1717–1777), poet and playwright
 Alexander Suvorov (1730–1800), Count of Rymnik, Prince of Italy, Count of the Holy Roman Empire, national hero of Russia, Generalissimo of the Russian Empire.
 Denis Fonvizin (1745–1792), playwright of the Russian Enlightenment.
 Alexander Kurakin (1752–1818), statesman and diplomat
 Grigory Ugryumov (1764–1823), portrait and history painter in the Classical style
 Andrey Melensky (1766–1833), Neoclassical architect
 Johann Friedrich Adam (1780–1838), botanist
 Alexey Venetsianov (1780–1847), painter
 Sophie Swetchine (1782–1857), a Russian mystic with a salon in Paris.
 Sergey Uvarov (1786–1855), classical scholar, an influential imperial statesman under Nicholas I of Russia
 Pyotr Vyazemsky (1792–1878), leading personality of the Golden Age of Russian poetry
 Alexander Griboyedov (1795–1829), diplomat, playwright, poet, and composer.
 Anton Delvig (1798–1831), poet and journalist
 Alexander Pushkin (1799–1837), poet and the founder of modern Russian literature.

19th century

1801–1850 
 Aleksey Khomyakov (1804–1860), theologian, philosopher and poet
 Dmitry Venevitinov (1805–1827), Romantic poet
 Alexandre Dubuque (1812–1898), Russian pianist, composer and teacher of French descent; he was born and died in Moscow
 Alexander Herzen (1812–1870), a Russian writer and thinker.
 Yevdokiya Rostopchina (1812–1858), one of the early Russian women poets
 Pavel Annenkov (1813–1887), literary critic and memoirist
 Ivan Gagarin (1814–1882), Jesuit
 Mikhail Lermontov (1814–1841), Romantic writer, poet and painter.
 Mikhail Katkov (1818–1887) an influential and conservative Russian journalist.
 La Païva (1819–1884), French courtesan
 Mikhail Dostoyevsky (1820–1864), short story writer, publisher, literary critic and the elder brother of Fyodor Dostoyevsky
 Fyodor Dostoyevsky (1821–1881), novelist, short story writer, essayist, journalist and philosopher.
 Arthur von Mohrenheim (1824–1906), diplomat
 Konstantin Pobedonostsev (1827–1907), jurist, statesman, and adviser to three Tsars.
 Alexei Savrasov (1830–1897), landscape painter
 Pavel Tretyakov (1832–1898), businessman, patron of art, collector, and philanthropist
 Andrei Famintsyn (1835–1918), botanist, public figure, and academician of the Petersburg Academy of Sciences
 Vasili Zinger (1836–1907), mathematician, botanist and philosopher
 Konstantin Makovsky (1839–1915), painter
 Wilhelm Junker (1840–1892), a Russian explorer of Africa.
 Peter Kropotkin (1842–1921), geographer, author, revolutionary and philosopher.
 Alexander Urusov (1843–1900), lawyer, literary critic, translator and philanthropist
 Mikhail Skobelev (1843–1882), an heroic Russian general, conquered Central Asia.
 Olga Fedchenko (1845–1921), Russian botanist
 Vladimir Makovsky (1846–1920), painter, art collector and teacher
 Vsevolod Miller (1848–1913), philologist, folklorist, linguist, anthropologist and archaeologist.
 Sofya Kovalevskaya (1850–1891), a Russian mathematician.

1851–1900 
 Leo Lopatin (1855–1920), philosopher
 Caran d'Ache (1858–1909), French satirist and political cartoonist.
 Sergey Malyutin (1859–1937), painter, architect and stage designer
 Aleksandr Golovin (1863–1930), artist and stage designer
 Vyacheslav Ivanov (1866–1949), poet, philosopher, translator, and literary critic.
 Wassily Kandinsky (1866–1944), painter and art theorist
 Nikolai Kischner (1867–1935), chemist
 Hans Pfitzner (1869–1949), German composer and self-described anti-modernist
 Alexander Scriabin (1872-1915) a Russian composer and virtuoso pianist. 
 Mikhail Bonch-Bruyevich (1870–1956), Imperial Russian and Soviet military commander, Lieutenant General
 Catherine Bartho (1873-??), ballerina
 Vladimir Bonch-Bruyevich (1873–1955), politician, historian, writer and Old Bolshevik
 Ivan Shmelyov (1873–1950), writer
 Semyon Frank (1877–1950), philosopher
 Alexander Goedicke (1877–1957), composer and pianist
 P. D. Ouspensky (1878–1947), mathematician and esotericist
 Sophie Fedorova (1879–1963), ballerina
 Aleksei Goncharov (1879–1913), chess master (born and died in Moscow)
 Andrei Bely (1880–1934), novelist, poet, theorist, and literary critic.
 Emanuel Goldberg (1881–1970), Israeli physicist and inventor
 Anna Abrikosova (1882–1936), prominent figure in the Russian Catholic Church
 Pavel Filonov (1883–1941), avant-garde painter, art theorist and poet
 Lev Kamenev (1883–1936), Bolshevik revolutionary; prominent Soviet politician
 Yosef Sprinzak (1885–1959), Israeli politician, Zionist and the first Speaker of the Knesset
 Robert Falk (1886–1958), painter
 Vladimir Favorsky (1886–1964), graphic artist, woodcut illustrator, painter, muralist and teacher
 Nikolai Vavilov (1887–1943), botanist and geneticist
 Sonja Schlesin (1888–1956), Gandhi's secretary in South Africa
 Joseph N. Ermolieff (1889–1962), film producer
 Alexis Granowsky (1890–1937), theatre director
 Boris Pasternak (1890–1960), poet, novelist, and literary translator (Nobel Prize for Literature in 1958).
 Robert Spiess (1891–1982), German tennis player
 Sergey Vavilov (1891–1951), physicist
 Marina Tsvetaeva (1892–1941), poet
 Sergei Efron (1893–1941), poet, officer of White Army and husband of Marina Tsvetaeva
 Vladimir Engelgardt (1894–1984), biochemist
 Arcady Boytler (1895–1965), producer, screenwriter and director
 Nikolai Grigoriev (1895–1938), chess player; composer of endgame studies (born and died in Moscow)
 Léonide Massine (1896–1979), choreographer and ballet dancer
 George Sachs (1896–1960), Russian-born German and American metallurgist
 Sophrony (Sakharov) (1896–1993), monk, theologian and writer
 Viktor Lazarev (1897–1976), art critic and historian
 M. Ageyev (1898–1973), author
 Leonid Leonov (1899–1994), novelist and playwright
 Georg Witt (1899–1973), Russian-born German film producer
 Mikhail Zharov (1899–1981), actor
 Nikolai Nekrasov (1900–1938), Esperanto writer, translator and critic

20th century

1901–1910 
 Vladimir Lugovskoy (1901–1957), constructivist poet
 Sergey Obraztsov (1901–1992), puppeteer
 Vladimir Fogel (1902–1929), silent film actor
 Yevgenia Ginzburg (1904–1977), author
 Vera Menchik (1906–1944), British-Russian chess player, the world's first women's chess champion
 Olga Menchik (1907–1944), Czech–British female chess master
 Lev Oborin (1907–1974), pianist
 Alexander Golitzen (1908–2005), production designer
 Boris Leven (1908–1986), Russian-born Academy Award-winning art director and production designer
 Georgy Gause (1910–1986), biologist
 Evgeny Golubev (1910–1988), composer (born and died in Moscow)
 Vladimir Shcherbakov (1909—1985), Soviet scientist and politician

1911–1920 
 Gavriil Kachalin (1911–1995), Russian football player and coach
 Alexey Lyapunov (1911–1973), mathematician and an early pioneer of computer science
 George Costakis (1913–1990), collector of Russian art
 Boris Carmi (1914–2002), Russian-born Israeli photographer
 Aleksander Gieysztor (1916–1999), Polish medievalist historian
 Vitaly Ginzburg (1916–2009), theoretical physicist, astrophysicist, Nobel laureate
 Jørgen Hviid (1916–2001), Danish and Latvian sportsman and naval officer
 Urie Bronfenbrenner (1917–2005), Russian-born American developmental psychologist
 Leonid Hurwicz (1917–2008), Polish-American economist and mathematician
 Tatiana Riabouchinska (1917–2000), Russian American prima ballerina and teacher
 George Zoritch (1917–2009), dancer

1921–1930 
 Spartak Belyaev (1923–2017), theoretical physicist
 Aryeh Eliav (1921–2010), Israeli politician
 Andrei Sakharov (1921–1989), nuclear physicist, Soviet dissident and human rights activist
 Kim Yaroshevskaya (1923), Russian-born Canadian film, television and stage actress
 Lidiya Alekseyeva (1924–2014), Russian basketball coach
 Maya Plisetskaya (1925–2015), ballet dancer, choreographer, ballet director, and actress
 Yevgeny Lyadin (1926–2011), football manager and player
 Boris Uspensky (1927–2005), poster and graphics painter
 Gurgen Askaryan (1928-1997), Armenian physicist
 Vladimir Sokolov (1928–1998), scientist in the field of zoology and ecology
 Sergei K. Godunov (1929), mathematician
 Lev Gor'kov (1929–2016), Russian-American research physicist
 Nikolai Karpov (1929–2013), ice hockey player
 Lyudmila Zykina (1929–2009), national folk singer of Russia
 Lev Yashin (1929–1990), football goalkeeper
 Viktor Frayonov (1930–2002), music theorist and teacher
 Lev Kuznetsov (1930–2015), fencer
 Oleg Popov (1930–2016), famous Soviet and Russian clown and circus artist

1931–1940 
 Lev Durov (1931–2015), theatre and film actor; a People's Artist of USSR
 Nikolay Kamenskiy (1931–2017), Soviet ski jumper
Alfred Kuchevsky (1931–2000), professional ice hockey player 
 Mark Midler (1931–2012), Olympic champion foil fencer
 Viktor Tsaryov (1931–2017), footballer
 Alla Gerber (1932), politician, journalist and film critic
 Yevgeni Urbansky (1932–1965), actor
 Yuri Druzhnikov (1933–2008), actor, photographer, editor, journalist and travel correspondent
 Nikolai Fadeyechev (1933–2020), dancer, People's Artist of the USSR
 Yelena Gorchakova (1933–2002), javelin thrower
 Stanislav Lyubshin (1933), actor and film director
 Boris Batanov (1934–2004), football player
 Georgy Garanian (1934–2010), jazz saxophone player, bandleader and composer
 Yuri Korolev (born 1934), ice hockey administrator, coach and civil servant
 Yuri Ovchinnikov (1934–1988), bioorganic chemist
 Victor Brailovsky (1935), computer scientist, aliyah activist, former Israeli politician
 Anatoliy Sass (1935), rower
 Philaret (Vakhromeyev) (1935–2021), emeritus Metropolitan of Minsk and Slutsk, the Patriarchal Exarch of All Belarus
 Leonid Yengibarov (1935–1972), clown and actor
 Oleg Fedoseyev (1936–2001), athlete
 Alexander Ginzburg (1936–2002), journalist, poet, human rights activist and dissident
 Natalya Gorbanevskaya (1936–2013), poet, translator of Polish literature and civil rights activist
 Yuri Popov (1936–2016), paleoentomologist
 Bella Akhmadulina (1937–2010), poet
 Yuri Falin (1937–2003), Soviet football player
 Yevgeny Feofanov (1937-2000), boxer
 Simon Gindikin (1937), mathematician at Rutgers University
 Bruno Mahlow (1937), German politician (SED/PDS/Die Linke) and former East German diplomat
 Umyar Mavlikhanov (1937–1999), fencer
 Aleksandr Medakin (1937–1993), football player
 Alexey Obukhov (1937), diplomat and author
 Boris Zaytsev (1937–2000), ice hockey player
 Valery Chalidze (1938–2018), Georgian-American author and publisher
 Galina Gorokhova (1938), fencer and five-time Olympic medalist, nine-time world gold medalist
 Boris Mayorov (1938), ice hockey player
 Yevgeni Mayorov (1938–1997), ice hockey player
 Mark Rakita (1938), two-time Olympic champion saber fencer
 Vladimir Vysotsky (1938–1980), singer-songwriter, poet, and actor
 Yury Glazkov (1939–2008), cosmonaut, major general in the Russian Air Force
 Viktor Shustikov (1939), footballer
 Elena Tchaikovskaia (1939), figure skating coach and choreographer
 Gennadi Volnov (1939–2008), basketball player
 Igor Ryomin (1940-1991), Soviet football player
 Alexei Fridman (1940–2010), Soviet physicist
 Vyacheslav Ionov (1940–2012), sprint canoer

1941–1950 
 Anatoli Firsov (1941–2000), ice hockey player
 Yevgeny Frolov (1941), boxer
 Gennady Logofet (1942–2011), footballer and football coach
 Vladimir Fedotov (1943–2009), football striker and manager
 Valentina Kamenyok-Vinogradova (1943–2002), volleyball player
 Aleksandr Filippenko (1944), actor
 Alexander Kovarski (1944), physical chemist and professor
 Viktor Logunov (1944), racing cyclist
 Viktor Luferov (1945–2010), singer-songwriter, multi-instrumentalist, poet and performer
 Vladimir Shcherbakov (1945-1993), footballer
 Victoria Fyodorova (1946–2012), Russian-American actress and author
 Aleksandr Gorshkov (1946), ice dancer, 1976 Olympic champion
 Zoja Rudnova (1946–2014), female table tennis player
 Alexander Varshavsky (1946), Russian-American biochemist
 Josef Zieleniec (1946), Czech politician and 1st Minister of Foreign Affairs of the Czech Republic
 Tasoltan Tazretovich Basiev (1947-2012), Russian scientist in the field of photonics
 Elena Fatalibekova (1947), chess Woman Grandmaster and the 2000, 2001 and 2004 Senior Women's World Chess Champion
 Karen Grigorian (1947–1989), chess master
 Boris Kerner (1947), German pioneer of three phase traffic theory
 Askold Khovanskii (1947), Russian and Canadian mathematician
 Yuri Ushakov (1947), career diplomat
 Valentin Kuklev (born 1948), Russian author and researcher of semantics
 Tatjana Lematschko (1948–2020), Russian-Swiss chess player
 Natalya Lebedeva (1949), athlete
 Aleksandr Lukyanov (1949), rower
 Alla Pugacheva (1949), musical performer
 Natalya Sokolova (1949), athlete
 Sabir Gusein-Zade (1950), mathematician
 Sergey Lavrov (1950), diplomat and currently the Foreign Minister of Russia
 Sergey Musaelyan (1950), pianist
 Tatyana Ovechkina (1950), basketball player

1951–1960 
 Vyacheslav Chanov (1951), football goalkeeper and coach
 Ivan Cherednik (1951), mathematician
 Aleksandr Laveykin (1951), cosmonaut
 Pyotr Mamonov (1951–2021), rock musician, songwriter and actor
 Vitaly Churkin (1952–2017), diplomat
 Arcadi Gaydamak (1952), Russian-born Israeli business magnate, investor and philanthropist
 Mikhail Kuznetsov (1952), rower
 Andrey Zubov (1952), historian and political scientist
 Alexander Barkashov (1953), political leader on the far-right
 Valery Gergiev (1953), conductor and opera company director
 Kirill Gevorgian (1953), diplomat and jurist
 Sergey Makarichev (1953), chess player
 Sergey Yastrzhembsky (1953), politician and diplomat
 Alexei Kornienko (1954), Austrian conductor and pianist of Russian descent
 Andrei Minenkov (1954), ice dancer
 Sergei O. Prokofieff (1954–2014), anthroposophist
 Andrei Gavrilov (1955), pianist
 Irina Moiseeva (1955), ice dancer
 Alex Nepomniaschy (1955), Russian-American cinematographer
 Sergei Petrenko (1955), professional football coach and former player
 Alexey Pajitnov (1955), video game designer
 Igor Chetvertkov(1956), painter, draftsman, and theater designer
 Kirill Eskov (1956), writer, biologist and paleontologist
 Yuri Felshtinsky (1956), Russian American historian
 Yegor Gaidar (1956–2009), economist, politician and author
 Alexey Ulyukaev (1956), politician, scientist, and economist
 Victor Vassiliev (1956), mathematician
 Nina Belyaeva (1957), public policy researcher 
 Olga Buryakina (1958), Russian basketball player
 Viacheslav Fetisov (1958), professional ice hockey defenseman
 Boris Fyodorov (1958–2008), economist, politician and reformer
 Nadezhda Ovechkina (1958), field hockey player and Olympic medalist
 Yuriy Pimenov (1958), Russian rower
 Vladimir Zubkov (1958), ice hockey player
 Irina Vdovets (1958 or 1959), rhythmic gymnastics coach
 Tom Cain (1959), English journalist and author
 Fyodor Cherenkov (1959–2014), football midfielder
 Sergey Golovkin (1959–1996), serial killer
 Simon Nabatov (1959), jazz pianist
 Vladimir Yakovlev (1959), journalist
 Marina Kosheveya (1960), swimmer and olympic champion
 Vladimir Pivtsov (1960), former Russian professional footballer
 Sergei Ponomarenko (1960), ice dancer

1961–1970 
 Oleg Bozhev (1961), speed skater
 Igor Glek (1961), chess Grandmaster, coach, theorist, writer and organiser
 Igor Moukhin (1961), photographer
 Igor Rivin (1961), Russian-Canadian mathematician
 Aleksandr Dugin (1962), political scientist
 Olga Golodets (1962), economist and the deputy prime minister for social affairs of the Russian Federation
 Eduardo del Llano (1962), Cuban writer, university professor, film director, producer and screenwriter
 Elena Denisova (1963), Austrian violinist and festival director of Russian descent
Maria Mazina (born 1964), Olympic champion épée fencer
 Sergey Zagraevsky (1964), painter, architectural historian, writer and theologian
 Igor Jijikine (1965), actor
 Igor Presnyakov (1965), guitarist
 Inna Zhelannaya (1965), singer-songwriter
 Nikolai Zykov (1965), actor, director, artist, designer, puppet-maker, master puppeteer
 Hilarion (Alfeyev) (1966), bishop of the Russian Orthodox Church, Metropolitan of Volokolamsk
 Natalya Kaspersky (1966), Russian IT entrepreneur, President of the 'InfoWatch' Group of companies, and co-founder and ex-CEO of antivirus security software company 'Kaspersky Lab'
 Olga Kryuchkova (1966), historical and mystical writer
 Maxim Udalov (1966), drummer of the Russian heavy metal band Aria
 Fedor Bondarchuk (1967), film director, actor, TV and film producer, clipmaker
 Masha Gessen (1967), journalist
 Andrey Chernyshov (1968), association football manager and former player
 Rubén Gallego (1968), writer
 Platon Obukhov (1968), journalist, writer, translator and painter
 Leonid Slutsky (1968), politician
 Sergei Fyodorov (1969), icon painter
 Stas Misezhnikov (1969), Israeli politician
 Yaroslav Ognev (1969), Internet personality, co-founder and the first editor-in-chief of inoSMI
 Elena Timina (1969), Russian-born Dutch professional table tennis player
 Anya Verkhovskaya (circa 1969), film producer and activist
 Sergei Filin (1970), ballet dancer and the Ballet Director of the Bolshoi Theater
 Alexander F. Gavrilov (1970), literary critic and editor
 Igor Girkin (1970), FSB Colonel
 Sergei Ovchinnikov (1970), manager and former association football goalkeeper
 Oleg Ovsyannikov (1970), ice dancer
 Kirill Preobrazhenskiy (1970), artist
 Dmitry Ulyanov (1970), professional footballer

1971–1980 
 Vladimir Fedorov (1971), ice dancer
 Kirill Gerasimov (1971), professional poker player
 Alexander Geringas (1971), record producer, songwriter and composer
 Ekaterina Gordeeva (1971), figure skater
 Vitaly Lunkin (1971), professional poker player
 Sergei Kishchenko (1972), former Russian professional football player
 Nikolai Lugansky (1972), pianist
 Sergey Brin (1973), computer scientist and internet entrepreneur who, co-founded Google
 Ivan Farmakovsky (1973), jazz pianist, composer and arranger
 Natalya Gorelova (1973), middle distance runner
 Anjelika Krylova (1973), ice dancer
 Aleksei Shiyanov (1973), Russian professional football official, former player
 Anya Ulinich (1973), Russian American novelist, graphic novelist, and short-story writer
 Alexander Braverman (1974), Israeli mathematician
 Jeanna Friske (1974–2015), film actress, singer and socialite
 Sergey Ryazansky (1974), cosmonaut
 Sergey Sharikov (1974–2015), 2x Olympic champion saber fencer
 Marina Yakusheva (1974), female badminton player
 Aleksey Glushkov (1975), wrestler and Olympic bronze medalist in Greco-Roman wrestling
 Konstantin Golovskoy (1975), footballer
 Olga Kern (1975), classical pianist
 Ilya Ponomarev (1975), politician, member of the State Duma, technology entrepreneur
 Andrei Soldatov (1975), investigative journalist and Russian security services expert
 Andrei Solomatin (1975), football manager, former player
 Natalia O'Shea (1976), harpist, singer-songwriter and linguist
 Greg Kasavin (1977), former site director and executive editor at the gaming website GameSpot
 Alex Miller (1977), Israeli politician
 Anna Pletnyova (1977), singer, composer and songwriter
 Olga Brusnikina (born 1978), competitor in synchronized swimming and three times Olympic champion
 Evgenia Kulikovskaya (1978), professional tennis player
 Pavel Trakhanov (1978–2011), professional ice hockey defenceman
 Olga Zaitseva (1978), biathlete
 Alexander Fomichev (1979), professional ice hockey goaltender
 Dmitry Glukhovsky (1979), author and journalist
 Simon Kozhin (1979), artist
 Svetlana Lunkina (1979), ballerina
 Kirill Terentyev (1979), football player
 Svetlana Feofanova (1980), pole vaulter
 Aleksey Lukyanuk (1980), rally driver
 Vitali Lykhin (1980), football player
 Andrei Sidelnikov (1980), Russian-born Kazakh professional footballer
 Regina Spektor (1980), Russian-born American singer-songwriter and pianist.

1981–1990

1981 
 Vasily Filippov (1981), handball player
 Sergio Galoyan (1981), songwriter, producer and DJ
 Elvira Khasyanova (1981), synchronised swimmer
 Dasha Zhukova (1981), businesswoman, art collector and magazine editor

1982 
 Tamilla Abassova (1982), Russian racing cyclist
 Tatiana Antoshina (1982), Russian road bicycle racer
 Aleksei Berezutski (1982), Russian association footballer
 Maksim Fokin (1982), former Russian professional footballer
 Alexander Frolov (1982), professional ice hockey player
 Pyotr Fyodorov (1982), actor
 Yelena Ovchinnikova (1982), competitor in synchronized swimming
 Aleksei Prokudin (1982), former Russian professional football player

1983 
 Aravina Anastasia (1983), Russian theater and film actress
 Igor Andreev (1983), Russian professional tennis player
 Evgeny Artyukhin (1983), Russian professional ice hockey right winger
 Yuliya Golubchikova (1983), pole vaulter
 Vladislav Kozhemyakin (1983), former professional footballer
 Sergey Lazarev (1983), singer
 Sergei Pereshivalov (1983), former professional footballer
 Mikhail Rozhkov (1983), football player

1984 
 Valeriya Gai Germanika (1984), film director
 Boris Giltburg (1984), Israeli classical pianist
 Alexander Grachev (1984), ice dancer
 Marina Karpunina (1984), Russian basketball player
 Lena Katina (1984), singer-songwriter, former t.A.T.u. member
 Evgeny Lapenkov (1984), professional ice hockey winger
 Kristina Oblasova (1984), figure skater
 Elena Romanovskaya (1984), ice dancer

1985 
 Sergey Borisov (1985), professional ice hockey goaltender
 Aleksey Cheremisinov (1985), fencer, 2012 European champion and 2014 World champion
 Gleb Galperin (1985), diver
 Alisa Ganieva (1985), author
 Alexander Ovechkin (1985), professional ice hockey winger
 Mikhail Rekudanov (1985), former professional football player
 Julia Volkova (1985), singer, former member of t.A.T.u.

1986 
 Valeria Bystritskaia (1986), German beauty queen, model and actress
 Boris Grachev (1986), chess Grandmaster
 Yury Kharchenko (1986), Russian German artist
 Darya Kustova (1986), professional Belarusian tennis player
 Evgenia Linetskaya (born 1986), Russian-born Israeli tennis player
 Kirill Lyamin (1986), professional ice hockey player
 Mikhail Magerovski (1986), figure skater
 Kirill Nababkin (1986), football player
 Mariya Ocher (1986), singer-songwriter, poet, director and visual artist
 Maksim Sidorov (1986), shot putter
 Gennady Stolyarov (1986), professional ice hockey right winger
 Nina Vislova (born 1986), badminton player

1987 
 Evgeny Busygin (1987), professional ice hockey player
 Anna Chipovskaya (1987), actress
 Andrei Grankin (1987), professional ice hockey player
 Shmuel Kozokin (1987), Israeli footballer
 Igor Makarov (1987), professional ice hockey player
 Igor Musatov (1987), professional ice hockey winger
 Olga Naidenova (1987), figure skater
 Olga Puchkova (1987), professional tennis player and model
 Alexander Uspenski (1987), figure skater
Polina Gagarina (1987), singer

1988 
 Artem Dzyuba (1988), footballer
 Marat Fakhrutdinov (1988), professional ice hockey forward
 Aleksandra Fedoriva (1988), track and field athlete
 Ekaterina Galkina (1988), curler
 Tatiana Golovin (1988), Russian-born French professional tennis player
 Ilya Kablukov (1988), professional ice hockey player
 Ekaterina Makarova (1988), professional tennis player
 Pavel Mamayev (1988), footballer
 Diana Yakovleva (1988), Russian foil fencer
 Ruslan Yarkhamov (1988), former professional footballer

1989 
 Nick Afanasiev (1989), Russian-born American actor
 Anastasia Baranova (1989), Russian-American actress
 Eve Harlow (1989), Russian-born Canadian actress
 Evgeny Kovalev (1989), professional cyclist
 Nastia Liukin (1989), Russian-American artistic gymnast
 Diana Markosian (1989), American and Russian documentary photographer, writer, and filmmaker
 Evgeniya Rodina (1989), professional tennis player
 Svetlana Romashina (1989), competitor in synchronized swimming; triple Olympic gold medalist
 Aziz Shavershian (1989-2011), Russian-Australian bodybuilder
 David Sigachev (1989), race car driver
 Filipp Toluzakov (1989), professional ice hockey player
 Evgenia Ukolova (1989), beach volleyball player
 Ilya Zhitomirskiy (1989–2011), Russian-American software developer and entrepreneur
 Misha Zilberman (1989), Israeli Olympic badminton player

1990 
 Lilia Biktagirova (1990), competitive figure skater
 Ekaterina Bobrova (1990), ice dancer
 Sergei Denisov (1990), professional ice hockey goaltender
 Evgeny Donskoy (1990), tennis player
 Ksenia Doronina (1990), figure skater
 Nikita Filatov (1990), professional ice hockey player
 Svetlana Filippova (1990), springboard diver
 Lukas Geniušas (1990), Lithuanian-Russian pianist
 Igor Golovkov (1990), professional ice hockey defenceman
 Mikhail Mamkin (1990), professional ice hockey defenceman
 Arina Martynova (1990), figure skater
 Nick Matuhin (1990), German freestyle wrestler
 Evgeny Novikov (1990), rally driver
 Nyusha (1990), singer-songwriter

1991–2000

1991
 Alexander Denezhkin (1991), ice hockey player
 Misha Ge (1991), Uzbekistani figure skater
 Nikita Katsalapov (1991), ice dancer
 Ivan Lukashevich (1991), racing driver
 Vyacheslav Pimenov (1991), triathlete
 Yury Revich (1991), classical violinist
 Ekaterina Riazanova (1991), Russian ice dancer
 Ivan Righini (1991), Russian-Italian competitive figure skater
 Anastasia Rybachenko (1991), political and civic activist
 Georgi Shchennikov (1991), footballer
 Anna Sidorova (1991), curler
 Marta Sirotkina (1991), tennis player
 Daniil Tarasov (1991), ice hockey player
 Yevgeni Tochilin (1991), former professional footballer 
 Nikita Zaitsev (1991), ice hockey defenceman

1992
 Stanislav Galiev (1992), ice hockey left winger
 Nikita Gusev (1992), ice hockey player
 Kirill Kabanov (1992), professional ice hockey forward
 Elena Nikitina (1992), skeleton racer
 Olga Podchufarova (1992), biathlete
 Artyom Pugolovkin (1992), ice hockey player
 Alexandra Saitova (1992), member of the Russian national women's curling team

1993
 Ivan Bukin (1993), ice dancer
Ilja Dragunov (1993), professional wrestler, first non-kayfabe Russian in WWE history
 Natela Dzalamidze (1993), Russian-Georgian tennis player
 Romina Gabdullina (1993), Russian female badminton player
 Artur Gachinski (1993), figure skater
 Aslan Karatsev (1993), tennis player
 Andrei Rogozine (1993), Canadian figure skater

1994
 Daria Gavrilova (1994), Russian-Australian tennis player
 Ilya Lyubushkin (1994), ice hockey player
 Artem Markelov (1994), racing driver

1995
 Ivan Barbashev (1995), ice hockey player
 Vyacheslav Karavayev (1995), footballer
 Yulia Putintseva (1995), tennis player
 Igor Shesterkin (1995), ice hockey goaltender
 Victoria Sinitsina (1995), ice dancer
 Sergey Sirotkin (1995), professional racing driver
 Margarita Mamun (1995), rhythmic gymnast
 Nikita Zadorov (1995),  ice hockey player

1996
 Daniil Dubov (1996), chess grandmaster
 Karen Khachanov (1996), tennis player
 Anna Ovcharova (1996), figure skater
 Adelina Sotnikova (1996), figure skater

1997
 Lina Fedorova (1997), pair skater
 Yana Kudryavtseva (1997), rhythmic gymnast

1998
 Vasilisa Davankova (1998), pair skater

1999
 Anastasiia Semenova (1999), Russian female badminton player
 Sofya Zhuk (1999), tennis player
 Evgenia Medvedeva (1999), figure skater
 Elena Radionova (1999), figure skater
 Nikita Mazepin (1999), formula one racing driver

2000
 Mikhail Ignatov (2000) association footballer
 Vladimir Moskvichyov (2000), association footballer
 Danila Proshlyakov (2000), association footballer
 Alexander Romanov (2000), ice hockey player
 Anton Shitov (2000), association footballer
 Elizabet Tursynbayeva (2000), figure skater

21st century

2001-2010

 Ekaterina Starshova (2001), actress
 Alena Kostornaia (2003), figure skater
 Polina Shmatko (2003), rhythmic gymnast 
 Mikhail Smirnov (2003), singer
 Anastasia Bezrukova (2004), actress and model
 Anna Shcherbakova (2004), figure skater 
 Lala Kramarenko (2004), rhythmic gymnast 
 Kristina Pimenova (2005), actress and model

Lived in Moscow 
 Mahmoud Abbas (1935), President of the State of Palestine and Palestinian National Authority, Chairman of the Palestine Liberation Organisation. Abbas studied at the Peoples' Friendship University, where he earned his doctorate.
 Alexander Afanasyev (1826–1871), folklorist who recorded and published over 600 Russian folktales and fairytales
 Alexander Belyaev (1884–1942), writer of science fiction, lived in Moscow after 1923
 Sergej Ognew (1886–1951), scientist, zoologist and naturalist, graduated from Moscow University in 1910
 Osip Mandelstam (1891–1938), Russian poet, moved to Moscow in 1922, exiled in 1934
 Anna Akhmatova (1889–1966), poet 
 Nadezhda Mandelstam (1899–1980), memoirist, first moved to Moscow in 1922, joined Osip Mandlestam in exile in 1934, returned to Moscow in 1964 
 Sergei Fomin (1917–1975), mathematician, entered Moscow State University at the age of 16
 Vera Gornostayeva (1929–2015), pianist and pedagogue
 German Fedorov-Davydov (1931–2000), historian, archaeologist, numismatist and art historian; professor of Moscow State University
 Oleg Gordievsky (1938), KGB defector
 Evgeny Kurochkin (1940–2011), paleornithologist, he graduated from the Moscow State University in 1964
 Svetlana Gannushkina (1942), mathematician and human rights activist, professor of mathematics at a Moscow university (1970–1999)
 Valentin Gavrilov (1946–2003), Soviet athlete who competed mainly in the high jump, he trained at Dynamo in Moscow
 Armen Oganesyan (1954), CEO of Russian state radio station Voice of Russia, educated at Moscow State University, Department of Journalism
 Karen Oganyan (1982), professional footballer, played in the Premier League with FC Moscow
 Dmitri Monya (1988), professional ice hockey winger who currently plays for HC CSKA Moscow of the Kontinental Hockey League (KHL)

See also 

 List of Russians
 List of Russian-language poets
 List of famous Russians

References

 
People
Moscow